MV Broadford was a vehicle ferry, built in 1966 for the Skye crossing. Superseded by larger, drive-through vessels, she was re-built and moved to the Kyles of Bute where she served until 1986.

History
MV Broadford was built to provide additional capacity on the Skye crossing. However, the service still struggled to keep up with increasing demand. Side-loading was slow and larger, bow-loading vessels were ordered for Skye.

Broadford remained for some months as spare vessel before joining her old consort on the Clyde. She underwent near-identical conversion at Lamont's but was not re-engined or shortened.

Layout
Broadford was similar to her sister, . She was built with side ramps with angled ends and a deck-turntable. Unlike Portree, her navigation bridge was placed aft for greater stability and her side-ramps were hydraulically operated and were significantly wider to accommodate large vehicles. She had no passenger lounge but in 1968, a very small shelter was fitted.

In 1971, she was converted to bow-loading, with a hydraulically operated bow ramp, hinged at three points and hanging from two long booms. She lost her side-ramps and deck-turntable and could then carry ten cars or one commercial vehicle and eight cars. Her vehicle deck was strengthened to carry 20-ton loads.

Service

Broadford continued to ply the Clyde as  Broadford Bay, a workboat without a vehicle-ramp. In 1988 she was named Boreford under the ownership of Divemex Ltd., Newtown Powys. She spent much of 2004 at Renfrew harbour.

References

Caledonian MacBrayne
1966 ships